is a Japanese voice actor from Hokkaido, Japan. He won the Best New Actor Award at the 11th Seiyu Awards. He is affiliated with Air Agency.

Filmography

TV Anime
Maji de Otaku na English! Ribbon-chan the TV (2013), Participant A
Pupipō! (2013), Ryōhei Ameyama
Days (2016), Minami
Mob Psycho 100 (2016), Shigeo Kageyama / Mob
Anime-Gataris (2017), Kai Musashisakai
Mob Psycho 100 II (2019), Shigeo Kageyama / Mob
Mob Psycho 100 III (2022), Shigeo Kageyama / Mob

Video Games
Nostalgia (2014), Regulus
Macross Delta Scramble (2016), Dominique Udetto
Crash Bandicoot 4: It's About Time (2020), Lani-Loli

Dubbing
Dragon Nest: Warriors' Dawn, Lambert

References

External links
 Official agency profile 
 

1991 births
Living people
Japanese male video game actors
Japanese male voice actors
Male voice actors from Hokkaido
21st-century Japanese male actors